Fanizani Akuda, also known as Fanizani Phiri, was a member of the sculptural movement usually called "Shona sculpture" (see Shona art and Art of Zimbabwe), although he and some others of its recognised members were not ethnically Shona. He worked initially at the Tengenenge Sculpture Community, 150 km north of Harare near Guruve, which he joined in 1966.

Fanizani died on 5 February 2011.

Early life and education
Fanizani Akuda, an ethnic Chewa was born in 1932 in what was then Northern Rhodesia. He received no formal schooling and in 1949 he moved to Southern Rhodesia in search of work. This led to employment as a cotton picker, bricklayer, and basket weaver: by 1966 he was working as a farm manager. However, in terms of his later success as a sculptor in stone, the most significant move came in that year when he was offered work by Tom Blomefield, a white South-African-born farmer of tobacco whose farm at Tengenenge near Guruve had extensive deposits of serpentine stone suitable for carving. Fanizani was initially a quarryman but after a period living in the artists’ community he took up sculpting: finding this provided a worthwhile financial return, he became a full-time sculptor alongside other well-known figures such as Henry Munyaradzi.

Later life and exhibitions
Akuda and his wife Erina had seven children. They had left Tengenenge in 1975 during the civil war, taking residence in Chitungwiza. After Zimbabwe’s independence in 1980, Tengenenge Sculpture Community re-established itself as a major sculpting centre but Fanizani did not return there. He continued to sculpt independently until his death in 2011.

In 1988, Fanizani’s sculpture Snake Man was highly commended in the Zimbabwe Heritage Exhibition, the annual exhibition of the National Gallery of Zimbabwe. Another of his 1988 works, I know you have stolen my eggs is pictured in the catalogue for the touring exhibition that visited European venues including the Yorkshire Sculpture Park in 1990

Akuda is probably best known for his ‘whistler’ figures. In these stylised heads, the prototypical face with its slit eyes is given a thin mouth line with a simple centrally placed borehole. This gives the ‘whistlers’ an acoustic trait: by tapping a thumb on the sculpture’s mouth, one can create a characteristic sound from the sculpture’s lips.

Olivier Sultan said of his work "His characters are tender and humorous, constantly smiling, with mysterious slit eyes. They are often formed in pairs or groups. To Fanizani, family represents a poetic world, moving in its simplicity and its tenderness."

Selected solo or group exhibitions
1967 to 1997: many Annual Heritage Exhibitions at the National Gallery, Harare
1970 Museum of Malawi, Blantyre
1980 "Tengenenge Stone Sculpture from Africa", Feingarten Galleries, Los Angeles, USA
1981 "Art from Africa", Commonwealth Institute, London, England
1982 Janet Fleisher Gallery, Philadelphia, USA 
1983 Images in Stone, Earl Sherman Gallery, Camerillo, California, USA
1985 "Zimbabwean Stone Sculpture", Kresge Art Museum, Michigan, USA
1986 Irving Sculpture Gallery, Sydney, Australia
1989 Zimbabwe op de Berg, Foundation Beelden op de Berg, Wageningen, The Netherlands
1990 Contemporary Stone Carving from Zimbabwe, Yorkshire Sculpture Park, UK
1993 Galerie Knud Grothe, Charlottenlund, Denmark
1995 Ointmoetting in Hamonie, Galerie de Strang, Dodewaard, The Netherlands
1998 Zimbabwe stenen Getuigenissen, Royal Museum for Central Africa, Tervuren, Belgium
2000 Kew Gardens, London, England
2005 The Legend of Zimbabwe's Stone Sculpture: Fanizani Akuda, solo retrospective, National Gallery of Zimbabwe, Harare, Zimbabwe
2006 Master Sculptors of Zimbabwe, Group exhibition, Italy

Further reading
Mor F. (1987) "Shona Sculpture". Jongwe Printing and Publishing Co, Harare. 
Winter-Irving C. “Stone Sculpture in Zimbabwe”, Roblaw Publishers (A division of Modus Publications Pvt. Ltd), 1991,  (Paperback)  (Cloth bound)
Winter-Irving C. “Pieces of Time: An anthology of articles on Zimbabwe’s stone sculpture published in The Herald and Zimbabwe Mirror 1999-2000”. Mambo Press, Zimbabwe, 2004, 
Joosten, Ben. Sculptors from Zimbabwe: the first generation. Dodewaard, Netherlands: Galerie de Strang, 2001. 400pp.

References

1932 births
2011 deaths
Zambian sculptors
Chewa
20th-century Zimbabwean sculptors
21st-century sculptors